Forss is a surname. Notable people with the surname include:

George Forss (1941–2021), American photographer
Henke Forss, Swedish musician from Mjölby
Julie Forss (born 1998), Finnish footballer
Marcus Forss (born 1999), Finnish footballer
Matti Forss (born 1957), retired Finnish professional ice hockey player
Oskar Forss, drummer, co-founder of the Swedish death metal band Therion
Rainer Forss (1930–2005), Finnish footballer and manager
Tero Forss (born 1968), Finnish footballer and manager

See also
Forss, village in Caithness, Scotland
Forss Water, known also as Forss River, has its source at the northern end of Loch Shurrey
 Forss, a musical project of SoundCloud co-founder Eric Wahlforss